The Achilles Club is a track and field club formed in 1920 by and for past and present representatives of Oxford and Cambridge Universities. Members have won 19 Olympic Gold Medals (most recently Steph Cook in 2000) and held 38 World Records. One of its founding members was Evelyn Montague, who, along with Harold Abrahams, is portrayed in the 1981 film Chariots of Fire.

References

External links
Official website

Sports clubs established in 1920
Oxbridge
1920 establishments in England